Words and Sounds Tour was a music tour in 2001 by American recording artist Jill Scott. The Words and Sounds tour started on January 27, in Atlanta, Georgia through the end of February.
By the spring Jill Scott ended her headlining tour during the winter, she was invited to join rock singer Sting on his US tour. Scott was featured as Sting's opening act for his itinerary of shows for the month of May.

Jill Scott was hospitalized for an illness a day after the tour kicked off on May 5, in D.C. She was treated and released with orders to rest for a week, as she would miss the first few shows. She soon recovered and joined Sting on May 15, when the tour arrived in Madison, Wisconsin at the Kohl Center. Scott resumed a North America second leg tour in July with dates scheduled through the summer.

The tour was later packaged and released as a two CD-set entitled Experience: Jill Scott 826+. The August 26, show was recorded at DAR Constitution Hall in Washington, D.C. Disc 1 is the live concert, while disc 2 showcases new material including poetry spoken to music known as "Thickness".

Opening act
 Mike Phillips (North America—Leg 2)

Set list
"Jilltro"
"A Long Walk"
"Love Rain" (Suite)
"Slowly Surely"
"One Is the Magic #"
"Brotha"
"Do You Remember"
"Gettin' In the Way"
"Honey Molasses" 1
"It's Love"
"The Way"
"Said Enough" 1
"Thickness" 1
"Fatback Taffy/ "
"He Loves Me (Lyzel In E Flat) / Movements I, II, & III)"

1 performed only at select venues

Band
 Musical Director/Keyboards: Pete Kuzma
 Erik Tribbett: Drums
 James Mason: Percussion
 Thaddaeus Tribbett: Bass
 Matt Cappy: Trumpet
 Jeff Bradshaw: Trombone
 Background vocals: Carol Riddick, Vivian Green, Monique Harcum

Tour dates

References

Jill Scott (singer) concert tours
2001 concert tours